Oxypolis rigidior, known as cowbane, common water dropwort, stiff cowbane, or pig-potato, is a species of flowering plant in the carrot family native to eastern North America. It is a perennial wildflower found in wet habitats. Oxypolis rigidior is poisonous to mammals.

Description
Oxypolis rigidior is 2–6 foot tall perennial herb of eastern North America. Its leaves are compound, odd-pinnate with 7-11 leaflets, and have variable shape. Umbels of 3 mm white flowers appear August to October. Flat fruits with conspicuous "wings" appear October through November.

The variable leaf shape may make identification challenging. Water hemlock, a related very poisonous species, which sometimes even shares the common name "cowbane", is similar, as is the closely related Savanna cowbane (Oxypolis ternata).

Taxonomy
Two varieties have been described, O. rigidior var. rigidior and O. rigidior var. ambigua.

Toxicity
Both roots and top parts are poisonous to mammals.

References

Apioideae
Flora of North America